Operation Argos is the Australian Defence Force's contribution to the international effort to enforce United Nations' sanctions against North Korea. The operation began in 2018, and is ongoing. The Australian effort is focused on detecting ship to ship transfers of contraband goods. It involves periodic deployments of aircraft and warships.

The international effort involves Australia, Canada, France, Japan, South Korea, New Zealand, the United Kingdom and the United States. It is coordinated by the United States Seventh Fleet.

Deployments
As of February 2023, there had been eight deployments of Royal Australian Navy warships and eleven deployments of Royal Australian Air Force maritime patrol aircraft to Operation Argos.

Deployments have included:
A RAAF P-8 Poseidon to Japan in May 2018
Two RAAF AP-3C Orions to North Asia in September 2018
 in September 2018
A RAAF P-8 Poseidon to Kadena Air Base in December 2018
 in late 2019
A RAAF P-8 Poseidon to Kadena Air Base in February 2020
A RAAF P-8 Poseidon to Kadena Air Base in September 2020
 in November 2020
A RAAF P-8 Poseidon to Kadena Air Base from late February to late March 2021
 in May 2021
A RAAF P-8 Poseidon to Kadena Air Base from August 2021
 in October 2021
HMAS Parramatta in mid-2022
HMAS Arunta in October 2022
A RAAF P-8 Poseidon to Kadena Air Base from February 2023

References

Argos
Sanctions against North Korea
Australia–North Korea relations